OSCAR 8 (also called AO-08, Phase 2D or Amsat P2D) is an American amateur radio satellite. It was developed and built by radio amateurs of the AMSAT and launched on March 5, 1978 as a secondary payload together with the earth observation satellite Landsat 3 from Vandenberg Air Force Base, California, United States.

The satellite had two linear transponders, from the 2-meter band (uplink) to the 10-meter band and the 70-centimeter band (downlink).

Frequencies

Transponder 1 
 Uplink (MHz): 145.850 - 145.900
 Downlink (MHz): 29.400 - 29.500
 Beacon (MHz): 29.402
 Mode: SSB CW

Transponder 2 
 Uplink (MHz): 145.900 - 146.000
 Downlink (MHz): 435.200 - 435.100
 Beacon (MHz): 435.095
 Mode: SSB CW

References

Satellites orbiting Earth
Amateur radio satellites
Spacecraft launched in 1978